Notophthiracarus is a genus of mites in the family Steganacaridae.

Species
 Notophthiracarus claviger Niedbała, 1993
 Notophthiracarus mahunkai Niedbała, 1987

References

Sarcoptiformes
Endemic fauna of New Zealand
Endemic acari of New Zealand